Tomás de la Torre Gibaja, O.P. or Tomás de Torres (1570–1630) was a Catholic prelate who served as Bishop of Córdoba (1628–1630) and Bishop of Paraguay (1620–1628).

Biography
Tomás de la Torre Gibaja was born in Madrid, Spain in 1570 and ordained a priest in the Order of Preachers.
On 30 March 1620, he was appointed during the papacy of Pope Paul V as Bishop of Paraguay.
On 15 August 1621, he was consecrated bishop by Pedro Carranza Salinas, Bishop of Buenos Aires. 
On 3 September 1628, he was selected as Bishop of Córdoba and confirmed by Pope Urban VIII on 11 December 1628.
He served as Bishop of Córdoba until his death on 17 July 1630.

References

External links and additional sources
 (for Chronology of Bishops) 
 (for Chronology of Bishops)  
 (for Chronology of Bishops) 
 (for Chronology of Bishops) 

17th-century Roman Catholic bishops in Argentina
Bishops appointed by Pope Paul V
Bishops appointed by Pope Urban VIII
1570 births
1630 deaths
People from Madrid
Dominican bishops
17th-century Roman Catholic bishops in Paraguay
Roman Catholic bishops of Paraguay
Roman Catholic bishops of Córdoba